

Seeds

Results

Section 1

Section 2

Section 3

Section 4

Finals

References
tournamentsoftware.com

- Mens Singles, 2006 Ibf World Championships